The 2011 NCAA National Collegiate Women's Ice Hockey Tournament involved eight schools in single-elimination play that determined the national champion of women's NCAA Division I college ice hockey. The Frozen Four was hosted by Mercyhurst College at Erie Insurance Arena in Erie, Pennsylvania.

Bracket
Quarterfinals held at home sites of seeded teams

Note: * denotes overtime period(s)

All-Tournament team
Forward: Brooke Ammerman, Wisconsin
Forward: Meghan Duggan, Wisconsin
Forward: Carolyne Prevost, Wisconsin
Defense: Alev Kelter, Wisconsin
Defense: Catherine Ward, Boston University
Goaltender: Molly Schaus, Boston College

References

NCAA Women's Ice Hockey Tournament

2011 in sports in Pennsylvania